Quincy Thomas Trouppe (December 25, 1912 – August 10, 1993) was an American professional baseball player and an amateur boxing champion. He was a catcher in the Negro leagues from 1930 to 1949. He was a native of Dublin, Georgia.

Early life
He was born Quincy Thomas Troupe on December 25, 1912. He later changed the spelling to Trouppe in 1946.

Career
He also played in the Mexican League, and the Canadian Provincial League. His teams included St. Louis Stars, Detroit Wolves, Homestead Grays, Kansas City Monarchs, Chicago American Giants, Indianapolis ABC's/St. Louis Stars, Cleveland Buckeyes (whom he managed to Negro American League titles in 1945 and 1947), New York Cubans, and Bismarcks (a/k/a Bismarck Churchills). He played in Latin America for fourteen winter seasons and barnstormed with black all-star teams playing against white major league players. He managed the Santurce Crabbers in the Puerto Rican winter league, winning the 1947-48 season championship.

Trouppe caught six games for the 1952 Cleveland Indians of Major League Baseball and made 84 appearances with their Triple-A farm club. When he made his major league debut on April 30, 1952 at Shibe Park he became one of the oldest rookies in MLB history. He was 39 years old. On May 3, he was behind the plate when relief pitcher "Toothpick Sam" Jones entered the game, forming the first black battery in American League history. Trouppe played his last game for the Indians on May 10. In his short stint with Cleveland he was 1-for-10 with a single (off Tommy Byrne of the St. Louis Browns in his last major league game), a walk and a run scored. He handled 25 chances in the field flawlessly for a fielding percentage of 1.000.

He died at the age of 80 in Creve Coeur, Missouri.

Managerial record

Bibliography
Trouppe, Quincy. 20 Years Too Soon (1977). Autobiography

References

External links
, or Seamheads
Baseball Library
Retrosheet
Venezuelan League

1912 births
1993 deaths
African-American baseball players
American expatriate baseball players in Mexico
Baseball players from Georgia (U.S. state)
Bismarck Churchills players
Charros de Jalisco players
Chicago American Giants players
Detroit Wolves players
Cleveland Buckeyes players
Cleveland Indians players
Diablos Rojos del México players
Drummondville Cubs players
Homestead Grays players
Indianapolis ABCs (1938) players
Indianapolis Indians players
Industriales de Monterrey players
Kansas City Monarchs players
Major League Baseball catchers
Navegantes del Magallanes players
American expatriate baseball players in Venezuela
Negro league baseball managers
People from Dublin, Georgia
St. Louis Cardinals scouts
St. Louis Stars (baseball) players
St. Louis Stars (1939) players
20th-century African-American sportspeople
Burials at Calvary Cemetery (St. Louis)
American expatriate baseball players in Colombia